Zappatite is a compilation album by American musician and composer Frank Zappa, released in September 2016. It is the second greatest hits album (to be released) of Zappa's best known material, the first one being Strictly Commercial released in August 1995. It replaces the Strictly Commercial set in Zappa's catalog.

Track listing

Credits
 All tracks produced by Frank Zappa except "Trouble Every Day" produced by Tom Wilson
 Compilation by Ahmet Zappa and Joe Travers 
 Concept: Ahmet Zappa
 Art layout: Keith Lawler
 Cover photography: Philip Gould
 Other photography: Ed Caraeff, Keith Lawler, uncredited
 Production management: Melanie Starks

References 

Frank Zappa compilation albums
Compilation albums published posthumously
2016 greatest hits albums